St Teilo's Church may refer to:

in Wales
 St Teilo's Church, Bishopston, Swansea
 St Teilo's Church, Llandeilo, Carmarthenshire
 St Teilo's Church, Llandeilo Tal-y-bont, now reconstructed at St Fagans National History Museum, Cardiff
 St Teilo's Church, Llandeloy, Pembrokeshire
 Church of St Teilo, Llantilio Crossenny, Monmouthshire
 Church of St Teilo, Llantilio Pertholey, Monmouthshire
 St Teilo's Church, Merthyr Mawr, Bridgend